Romoland is a census-designated place (CDP) in Riverside County, California, United States. The population was 1,684 at the 2010 census, down from 2,764 at the 2000 census.

History
On June 25, 1900, the first Ethanac Post Office was established across Highway 74, named after Ethan Allen Chase (an early settler to the area), with John Gaston serving as
the first postmaster. In 1925, the town of Ethanac changed to "Romola Farms", developed by the Pacific Mutual Life Insurance Company. The developer sold off small ranches of four to five acres for the cultivation of fig trees, and grapes. The project became so popular that the Ethanac post office would be changed to Romola Farms. When the Post Office Department requested the name change, to avoid confusion with San Diego County's Ramona post office, the name was changed for a final time to Romoland. The origin of the development of the name has never been revealed.

In 1985, Leon E. Motte built the "Motte's Romola Farms" Barn off Highway 74, designed by architect Robert Morris. After building the barn from all salvaged materials, the Mottes sold produce for 10 years before leasing it out to other food vendors, such as Tom's Farms and Hamshaw Farms. In 2011, Motte's Romola Farms reopened as the Motte Historical Museum. The Motte Historical Museum is now a classic car museum and showcases the history of the surrounding valley, as well as documenting the area's agricultural roots. The "Motte's Romola Farms" Barn has always been a longtime landmark on Highway 74.

On October 1, 2008, a significant portion of Romoland became part of the then-newly incorporated City of Menifee.

Geography

Romoland is located at  (33.745783, -117.174228).

However, prior to its incorporation into the city of Menifee, California, the Romoland region was considered to encompass the entire unincorporated area between Perris, Homeland, Nuevo, and Menifee. The total population prior to Menifee's incorporation in 2008 may have exceeded 100,000 residents in the  area. To the east, the school district extended to Green Acres, east of Homeland. Menifee and Nuevo have their own school districts. When Sun City was built, Menifee then included the Sun City area.

According to the Geographic Names Information System, the town previously had the toponyms Ethanac and Ethanac Siding.

Demographics

2010
At the 2010 census Romoland had a population of 1,684. The racial makeup of Romoland was 958 (56.9%) White, 65 (3.9%) African American, 8 (0.5%) Native American, 35 (2.1%) Asian, 12 (0.7%) Pacific Islander, 514 (30.5%) from other races, and 92 (5.5%) from two or more races. Hispanic or Latino of any race were 865 people (51.4%).

The whole population lived in households, no one lived in non-institutionalized group quarters and no one was institutionalized.

There were 455 households, 232 (51.0%) had children under the age of 18 living in them, 287 (63.1%) were opposite-sex married couples living together, 46 (10.1%) had a female householder with no husband present, 34 (7.5%) had a male householder with no wife present.  There were 27 (5.9%) unmarried opposite-sex partnerships, and 6 (1.3%) same-sex married couples or partnerships. 61 households (13.4%) were one person and 14 (3.1%) had someone living alone who was 65 or older. The average household size was 3.70.  There were 367 families (80.7% of households); the average family size was 4.07.

The age distribution was 502 people (29.8%) under the age of 18, 221 people (13.1%) aged 18 to 24, 395 people (23.5%) aged 25 to 44, 434 people (25.8%) aged 45 to 64, and 132 people (7.8%) who were 65 or older.  The median age was 32.0 years. For every 100 females, there were 100.0 males.  For every 100 females age 18 and over, there were 100.7 males.

There were 512 housing units at an average density of 193.6 per square mile, of the occupied units 351 (77.1%) were owner-occupied and 104 (22.9%) were rented. The homeowner vacancy rate was 3.3%; the rental vacancy rate was 3.7%.  1,288 people (76.5% of the population) lived in owner-occupied housing units and 396 people (23.5%) lived in rental housing units.

2000
At the 2000 census there were 2,764 people, 785 households, and 620 families in the CDP. The racial makeup of the CDP was 54.1% White, 2.5% African American, 1.7% Native American, 0.3% Asian, 0.2% Pacific Islander, 36.7% from other races, and 4.6% from two or more races. Hispanic or Latino of any race were 55.4%.

Of the 785 households 43.1% had children under the age of 18 living with them, 59.1% were married couples living together, 12.7% had a female householder with no husband present, and 20.9% were non-families. 15.9% of households were one person and 7.3% were one person aged 65 or older.  The average household size was 3.5 and the average family size was 3.9.

The age distribution was 34.8% under the age of 18, 9.8% from 18 to 24, 27.9% from 25 to 44, 19.0% from 45 to 64, and 8.5% 65 or older.  The median age was 29 years. For every 100 females, there were 103.5 males.  For every 100 females age 18 and over, there were 102.0 males.

The median household income was $33,523 and the median family income  was $37,574. Males had a median income of $23,850 versus $18,971 for females. The per capita income for the CDP was $12,932.  About 20.5% of families and 25.9% of the population were below the poverty line, including 30.6% of those under age 18 and 20.6% of those age 65 or over.

Politics
In the state legislature Romoland is located in the 37th Senate District, represented by Republican Bill Emmerson, and in the 65th Assembly District, represented by Republican Paul Cook.

References

Census-designated places in Riverside County, California
Perris, California
Census-designated places in California